Pinko is an Italian women's fashion brand. It was founded in the early 1980s by Pietro Negra, the current CEO, and his wife Cristina Rubini. As of 2016, they have over 500 retail outlets worldwide.

Designers who have created collections for Pinko include Mark Fast, Alessandra Facchinetti, and Marina Spadafora. Pietro Negra's daughters, Cecilia and Caterina, work for Pinko.

See also 
 Italian fashion

References

External links
 
 

Clothing companies established in 1986
Italian companies established in 1986
Companies based in the Province of Parma
Clothing brands of Italy
Italian suit makers
High fashion brands
Shoe companies of Italy
Fashion accessory brands